Magaly Montes (born 10 February 1968) is a Peruvian table tennis player. She competed in the women's doubles event at the 1992 Summer Olympics.

References

1968 births
Living people
Peruvian female table tennis players
Olympic table tennis players of Peru
Table tennis players at the 1992 Summer Olympics
Place of birth missing (living people)
Table tennis players at the 1991 Pan American Games
Medalists at the 1991 Pan American Games
Pan American Games medalists in table tennis
Pan American Games bronze medalists for Peru
20th-century Peruvian women
21st-century Peruvian women